Pine Grove Park was a South Mountain Railroad excursion park "in a grove of magnificent trees"  established by Colonel Jackson C. Fuller   It was located east of the Pine Grove Iron Works near Toland in Cumberland County, south-central Pennsylvania It was in the South Mountain Range of the northern Blue Ridge Mountains System.

Colonel Fuller also owned a farm in the area, and established the railroad's Round Top Park at the Gettysburg Battlefield in 1884.

History
The park had the "Fuller Cornet Band" for entertainment, and Fuller hosted the American Institute of Mine Engineers in 1881 and "J.C. Fuller’s Fifth Annual Reunion" in 1883. By July 1884 the park included a green field for baseball and other games "at the Park station", water fountains, lunch tables & seats, large dancing pavilion, long bowling alley, children's swings, a carousel (flying horses, etc.), and a nearby  rifle range.

A Baldwin steam car carried visitors between the park and the iron works, and the "first hard day's practice" of the 1903 Dickinson College football team was at the park. Both "Pine Grove Park" and "Pine Grove Furnace" were listed in 1904 as railway stations of the Hunter's Run and Slate Belt Railroad, but the park ended operations  and was in "ruins" when the Reading Company laid new tracks in 1912.

Pine Grove Furnace State Park
A January 1913 plan to restore the private park was superseded by the commonwealth's purchase of the surrounding area, which is now Pine Grove Furnace State Park.

See also

References

External links

Amusement parks in Pennsylvania
Defunct amusement parks in Pennsylvania
History of Cumberland County, Pennsylvania
Parks in Cumberland County, Pennsylvania
South Mountain Range (Maryland−Pennsylvania)
1881 establishments in Pennsylvania